Second Hand Rose is a Chinese rock band from Beijing, China. The band is known for its combination of traditional Chinese instruments with rock and roll fundamentals, as evident in their use of traditional Chinese instruments in both their recordings and live performances. Their debut album, the self-titled Second Hand Rose Band, was released in 2004 to critical acclaim in China's bigger cities, as well as receiving generally positive reviews on specialist music websites in the U.S. 

The group was formed in August 2000. Before the release of their second album the band was known as "Second Hand Rose Band", but the word "band" was dropped with the release of their second album and they are now merely known as "Second Hand Rose". Over the years, the line-up of the band has changed frequently. Lead singer Liang Long and Chinese traditional instrument player Wu Zekun are the only two band members who are with the band since it was formed, although guitar player Yao Lan has been with the band for several years.

Liang long has been known to dress as a woman on stage, in recent years wears more conventional clothes during performances and has shaved off his long hair. Hailing from the Heilongjiang province in northeast China, his stage antics and flamboyant look have earned the band controversy in their native China.  

In 2002, Second Hand Rose became the only foreign band to be invited to play at the Swiss Snow Mountain Music Festival, an annual event attracting some of Switzerland's established musical names. They were also one of the few Chinese rock bands invited to perform in Shanghai at the 2003 China-Japan Pop Music Exchange Concerts, an event organized by Japan's public broadcaster NHK. When the Amsterdam China Festival was held in the Netherlands in 2004, Second Hand Rose was also one of the bands invited.

The band (Liang Long with a new line-up) released their second album in late 2006. The album, titled Yu Le Jiang Hu (娱乐江湖), contains ten new studio recordings that have been well received by the specialist and online press in Mainland China. The video clip to the first single, 狼心狗肺, was also included on the release. The band mainly perform in Beijing, but they tour to other Chinese cities to perform as well.  Although they are one of China's most popular rock bands, they remain an alternative act with a non-mainstream following.

Line-up
Liang Long (梁龙), vocals, guitar
Yao Lan (姚澜), lead guitar
Li Ziqiang (李自强), bass
Wu Zekun (吴泽琨), Chinese traditional instruments
Sun Quan (孙权), drums

Discography
2004 - Second Hand Rose Band (二手玫瑰)
2005 - 玫开二度
2006 - The World of Entertainment (娱乐江湖) (CD + VCD)
 2009 - Lover (情儿) (CD+DVD)
 2010 - Everyone Wants To Be The Leader Singer (人人有颗主唱的心)
 2013 - Stealing The Show ''(一枝独秀)

References 

Chinese rock music groups
Musical groups established in 2000
Musical groups from Beijing